Bickerton is a surname which may refer to:
The name Bickerton is derived from the Old English beocere, which means bee-keeper, and tun, which originally translated to an enclosure or fence. However this came to mean a fence around a house, homestead, village or town at an early date. Thus the name can be understood to mean village of the bee-keeper. The last name originated in Malpas, Cheshire during the Norman Conquest of England, where they held a seat. The name is also estimated to have originated in Rothburg in Northumberland and Bilton, in the West Riding of Yorkshire.

Notable names:
Alexander William Bickerton (1842–1929), first Professor of Chemistry at the University of Canterbury, teacher of Ernest Rutherford
Ashley Bickerton (1959-2022), American artist, son of Derek Bickerton
Arthur Bickerton (1919–1992), Australian politician
Derek Bickerton (1926–2018), U.S. linguist
Francis Howard Bickerton (1889–1954), British Antarctic explorer
Jane Howard, Duchess of Norfolk (1643/4-1693), née Bickerton
Louie Bickerton (1902–1998), Australian female tennis player
Sir Richard Bickerton, 1st Baronet (1727–1792), British Royal Navy rear admiral
Sir Richard Bickerton, 2nd Baronet (1759–1832), British Royal Navy admiral
Thomas Bickerton (born 1958), U.S. bishop in the United Methodist Church
Wayne Bickerton (born 1941), British songwriter, record producer and music business executive
William Bickerton (1815–1905), founder of the Church of Jesus Christ (Bickertonite), a restorationist Christian church with roots in the Latter Day Saint movement